"Conversations in the Dark" is a song by American singer and songwriter John Legend. It was released as a single on January 10, 2020, by Columbia Records and Sony Music as the lead single from his seventh studio album Bigger Love. A remix of the song with French DJ David Guetta was released on February 14, 2020.

Live performances
On February 14, 2020, Legend performed the song live on The Ellen Show, he was joined by a band and violinist Lindsey Stirling. Legend was also the guest host of show, he presented a clip of himself serenading random people in a Starbucks and handed out some treats to the unsuspecting customers. He gives some of his iconic songs new lyrics about lattes and runs around the coffee shop giving everyone extra whipped cream.

Background
The release of the single coincided with Legend's guest appearance on the award-winning NBC family comedy drama television series, This Is Us, where the song featured. The song was written by Legend, Gregg Wattenberg, Jesse Fink, Kellen Pomeranz, Chance Peña and was produced by Gregg Wattenberg and Pom Pom.

Track listing

Personnel
Credits adapted from Tidal.
 Gregg Wattenberg – producer, composer, lyricist, background vocal, bass, guitar
 Pom Pom – producer, background vocal, bass, programmer
 Chance Peña – composer, lyricist, background vocal
 Jesse Fink – composer, lyricist, background vocal
 John Stephens – composer, lyricist, associated performer, background vocal
 Kellen Pomeranz – composer, lyricist
 David Guetta – associated performer, re-mixer
 Mia Wattenberg – background vocal
 Gerry "The Gov" Brown – mixing engineer
 Matt Becks – mixing engineer
 Benzi Edelson – piano
 Danae Greenfield – piano
 Anthony Kilhoffer – recording engineer

Charts

Certifications

References

2020 songs
2020 singles
John Legend songs
David Guetta songs
Song recordings produced by David Guetta
Songs written by Gregg Wattenberg
Songs written by John Legend